Kailu County (Mongolian:   Ḵayilü siyan) is a county in the east of Inner Mongolia, People's Republic of China. It is under the administration of Tongliao City,  to the east, and China National Highway 303 passes through it.

History

As the traditional seat of Ar Khorchin, East Jaruud and West Jaruud, the 3 areas are abbreviated in Chinese as the 3 R's since each contains the word R transcribed as "LU" in Chinese. The 3 R's was then known as the 3 Lu's as well. In 1905, with the slogan of developing the 3 R's (開發三魯), the city took the name of such abbreviation and was named 開魯 (KAI LU).

Climate
Kailu County features a cold semi-arid climate (Köppen BSk), marked by long, very cold and dry winters, hot, somewhat humid summers, and strong winds, especially in spring.

References

www.xzqh.org 

 
County-level divisions of Inner Mongolia
Tongliao